mydentist is the largest dental provider in the UK, with around 600 practices. mydentist is a trading style of IDH Group Limited, based in Kearsley. Tom Riall is the Chief Executive of mydentist. 

mydentist treats a mixture of private and NHS patients. In 2018 it treated more than four million people. In 2022 this increased to over 5 Million people.

It runs an annual clinical conference, which in 2018 was attended by more than 600 dentists and dental professionals. In 2022, the company announced the clinical conference coming back after a break during covid 

In January 2019 Matt Hancock visited its surgery in Mildenhall and said: “Companies like MyDentist play a really important role in delivering a good service to keep our nation’s teeth strong.”  He was criticised because the firm charges much more than NHS rates. Its dentures cost £878 compared to £256.50 on the NHS. Jon Ashworth said: “Surely the priority should be expanding access to NHS dentistry for everyone, not endorsing private firms for the better off.”  Tom Riall said the firm was developing "an affordable range of private dentistry because so many practices are closed to NHS patients.”  Healthwatch Suffolk and the British Dental Association both pointed out that patients on low incomes  rely on NHS dentistry but in the area of Bury St Edmunds the nearest surgery taking adult NHS patients was ten miles away and what was on offer from the company was not affordable for them.

The company was acquired by Palamon Capital Partners from the Carlyle Group in May 2021. In 2022, IDH Group sold DD (Previously known as Dental Directory) to Sun European Partners.

History
In February 2021, mydentist invested £1.2 million in a new practice in Railway Road, Blackburn merging together 3 previous practices into 1. This meant that practices at Preston New Road, Blackburn and Langham Road, Blackburn closed.

In February 2022, mydentist expanded its Coalville practice into a new premises in a £700,000 investment.

In June 2022, mydentist opened a new orthodontic practice in Grimsby in a £400,000 investment.

See also
Private healthcare in the United Kingdom

References

Dental companies
Health care companies of the United Kingdom
Dentistry in England